Somray, or Northern Chong, is a Pearic language of Cambodia.

Geographical distribution
Somray is spoken in the following areas of Cambodia.
Battambang province: Phumi Chhak Rokar area (Baradat ms.)
Koh Kong province: far north
Pursat province: 2 areas, north, east, and west of Phum Tasanh, and Tanyong river around Phum Pra Moi

The extinct Somre of Siem Reap (Moura 1883) was a dialect of the same language.

References

Pearic languages
Endangered Austroasiatic languages